Radoslav Antl (born 2 March 1978) is a retired Slovak handball player and former coach of  HT Tatran Prešov in the Slovak Extraliga. He also played for the Slovak national handball team.

External links
 Radoslav Antl profile
 Profile at ehfcl.com

Slovak male handball players
Living people
1978 births
Slovak people of German descent
Sportspeople from Košice